Sara Luzita ( Jacobs, born 11 August 1922) is a British dancer who specialises in ballet and Spanish dancing. She was a soloist for the Ballet Rambert (now Rambert Dance Company), performing in the West End, the international stage and on screen, including the films Moulin Rouge and Oh... Rosalinda!!.

Personal life 
Sara married Tutte Lemkow in 1954. They had two daughters, Rachel and Rebecca.

References

External links 
 

1922 births
Living people
People from Hanley, Staffordshire
British ballerinas

British centenarians
Women centenarians